Same-sex marriage has been legal in Chiapas in accordance with a Supreme Court ruling issued on 11 July 2017 that the ban on same-sex marriage violated the equality and non-discrimination provisions of Articles 1 and 4 of the Constitution of Mexico. The ruling, published in the Official Journal of the Federation on 11 May 2018, legalized same-sex marriage in the state of Chiapas.

Legal history

Background

The Mexican Supreme Court ruled on 12 June 2015 that state bans on same-sex marriage are unconstitutional nationwide. The court's ruling is considered a "jurisprudential thesis" and did not invalidate state laws, meaning that same-sex couples denied the right to marry would still have to seek individual amparos in court. The ruling standardized the procedures for judges and courts throughout Mexico to approve all applications for same-sex marriages and made the approval mandatory. Specifically, the court ruled that bans on same-sex marriage violate Articles 1 and 4 of the Constitution of Mexico. Article 1 of the Constitution states that "any form of discrimination, based on ethnic or national origin, gender, age, disabilities, social status, medical conditions, religion, opinions, sexual orientation, marital status, or any other form, which violates the human dignity or seeks to annul or diminish the rights and freedoms of the people, is prohibited.", and Article 4 relates to matrimonial equality, stating that "man and woman are equal under the law. The law shall protect the organization and development of the family." The Constitution of Chiapas does not expressly forbid the recognition of same-sex marriages. Article 9 of the Constitution states that "the State of Chiapas will promote policies aimed at guaranteeing the right of every person to: [...] the protection of the development of their family."

In January 2014, activists filed a complaint with the National Council to Prevent Discrimination against Mayor Rafael Guira Aguilar of Chilón. Guira Aguilar was accused of sponsoring a religious campaign against same-sex marriage and abortion by financing build boards calling bills legalising abortion, same-sex marriage and marijuana "violations of God's commandments" and saying "the wages of sin is death". Human rights groups said the mayor's financial support for the campaign violated secular principles.

On 25 September 2014, Equal Marriage Mexico filed an amparo contesting the constitutionality of articles 144 and 145 of the Civil Code of Chiapas. Article 144 stated that marriage is an institution whose goal was "perpetuating the species", while article 145 required "the man and woman" to be at least 16 years of age. On 3 March 2015, the Supreme Court ruled against the state, declared the two articles unconstitutional, and gave the 51 plaintiff couples the right to marry. On 26 March 2015, a document published by the state Congress denounced the ruling, asking for a review and stating that same-sex marriage was "unnatural" while making comparisons of homosexual relationships to incest. The chairman of the Board of Directors of Congress, Jorge Enrique Hernández Bielma, later denied the filing of the review stressing that only he had the power to make the request and insisting that he had never signed any document regarding the issue. However, on 16 April 2015, the media revealed that the state's Judicial Council website had received the review request on 23 March 2015 and had already assigned a number to the case. In September 2016, the Supreme Court ruled against the state on appeal and declared the state's same-sex marriage ban unconstitutional.

In December 2015, a lesbian couple was married in Tuxtla Gutiérrez after having successfully won an amparo in the courts. The couple, who remained anonymous, were the first same-sex couple to marry in Chiapas. In July 2016, the Second District Court granted an amparo to a male couple from San Cristóbal de Las Casas.

Legislative action
Legislation to permit same-sex marriages was first proposed in Chiapas in 2012. On 15 February 2012, various LGBT associations presented measures to the executive and legislative branches of government recommending amendments to the Civil Code to allow same-sex couples to marry. On 29 November 2013, human rights activist Diego Cadenas Gordillo presented the Congress of Chiapas with a bill to legalize same-sex marriage. The proposal was rejected by Congress on 13 December 2013, citing that "popular initiatives" must be supported by 1.5% of the electorate, or 50,500 voters. On 3 January 2014, an injunction was filed with a federal judge due to the Congress' refusal to act on the measure. The judge rejected the injunction, and shortly thereafter activists filed an appeal with the Twentieth Circuit Court. In November 2014, Gordillo filed a request for formal intervention by the Inter-American Commission of Human Rights (IACHR), claiming that neither Congress nor Governor Manuel Velasco Coello had responded to the discriminatory laws banning same-sex marriage in Chiapas. The IACHR officially received the request and registered it as case 1728-14.

On 27 March 2014, Deputy Alejandra Ruiz Soriano from the Party of the Democratic Revolution (PRD) introduced a bill to amend article 144 of the Civil Code to state that marriage is "the free union of two people for the community of life, where both respect, equality and mutual aid are sought." The bill would have also standardized concubinage, regardless of sexual orientation. It stalled in Congress, having not even received a first reading two years after introduction. Another same-sex marriage bill was introduced to Congress in May 2016. The bill would not have addressed adoption by same-sex couples. As with the previous proposal, it stalled.

As of June 2022, a bill to codify same-sex marriage in the Civil Code is pending in Congress.

Action of unconstitutionality (2016–2017)
On 6 April 2016, the National Human Rights Commission filed an action of unconstitutionality (docketed 32/2016) with the Mexican Supreme Court. The Congress of Chiapas had recently amended state family law but while doing so did not repeal the state's ban on same-sex marriage. The Commission took this opportunity to file the action of unconstitutionality. The action sought to legalize same-sex marriage in Chiapas, similarly to Jalisco, where the Supreme Court struck down that state's same-sex marriage ban in a unanimous ruling in early 2016.

On 11 July 2017, the court ruled that the heterosexual definition of marriage in the Civil Code was unconstitutional under the equality and non-discrimination of Articles 1 and 4 of the Constitution of Mexico, legalizing same-sex marriage in the state and specifying that a judicial  is no longer required. The first same-sex marriage ceremony following the ruling occurred in late July 2017, though the couple still married using an amparo. The ruling would come into effect upon publication in the Official Journal of the Federation (Diario Oficial de la Federación). On 30 October 2017, the ruling still not published, the civil registry began nonetheless accepting marriage applications from same-sex couples. The first couple to marry without an amparo did so in San Cristóbal de las Casas that day. The ruling was officially published on 11 May 2018. State officials have also confirmed that the court ruling permits same-sex couples to adopt.

Marriage statistics
More than 300 same-sex marriages were performed in Chiapas between December 2017 and June 2018, with most being performed in Tuxtla Gutiérrez, San Cristóbal de las Casas, Tapachula and Comitán. Many couples were from other states, including from Tabasco, Veracruz and Oaxaca.

Public opinion
A 2017 opinion poll conducted by  found that 39% of Chiapas residents supported same-sex marriage, the second lowest in the entire nation, while 58% were opposed.

According to a 2018 survey by the National Institute of Statistics and Geography, 59% of the Chiapas public opposed same-sex marriage, the highest in Mexico.

See also

 Same-sex marriage in Mexico
 LGBT rights in Mexico

Notes

References

External links
Acción de Inconstitucionalidad 32/2016, Supreme Court ruling declaring Chiapas' same-sex marriage ban unconstitutional

Chiapas
Chiapas
2017 in LGBT history